Zimbabwe Women Writers (ZWW) is an organization for women writers established in 1990 in Zimbabwe. It was "the first women's organization in Zimbabwe and in Southern Africa to address gender imbalance through writing and publishing".

Established in response to a need expressed at a 1990 writers' workshop, ZWW had over ninety branches across Zimbabwe by the turn of the century. In its first decade, it published over two hundred books by women, in English, Shona and Ndebele. In 1990 a few women writers formed Zimbabwe Women Writers (ZWW) to promote women's writings in the country. It now has 600 members and 56 branches in both the rural and urban areas throughout the country.

Publications
 Kitson, Norma, Anthology of Zimbabwe Women Writers. Zimbabwe: ZWW, 1994. With a foreword by David Karimanzira.
 Selections: English Poetry and Short Stories. Harare: ZWW, 1997, repr. 2001. 
 Inkondlo [Selections]. Harare: ZWW, 1998. (A Ndebele anthology.)
 Nhetembo [Selections]. Harare: ZWW, 1990. (A Shona anthology.)
 Women of Resilience: The voices of women ex-combatants. Harare: Zimbabwe Women Writers, 2000. 
 A Tragedy of Lives. Harare: Zimbabwe Women Writers, 2003.

References

External links
 https://openlibrary.org/publishers/Zimbabwe_Women_Writers
 https://www.icj.org/zimbabwe-parliamentarian-joana-mamombe-must-be-provided-urgent-medical-care/
 https://weaverpresszimbabwe.com/reviews/13-women-writing-zimbabwe

1990 establishments in Zimbabwe
Women's organisations based in Zimbabwe
Organizations for women writers
Organizations established in 1990